The World Islamic Congress was convened in Jerusalem in December 1931 at the behest of Mohammad Amin al-Husayni, the Grand Mufti of Jerusalem, and Maulana Shaukat Ali, leader of the Indian Caliphate Committee. Ostensibly the Congress was called to consider a proposal to establish a University at the Al-Aqsa Mosque in Jerusalem as a center of Islamic scholarship, an idea which the leaders of the prestigious Al-Azhar University in Cairo opposed and which never came to fruition. 

Attended by 130 delegates from 22 Muslim countries, the Congress called on Muslim states to avoid trade with the Jewish community in Palestine. 

However, the Congress was viewed widely as an attempt by the mufti to enhance his prestige in advance of a bid for the office of caliph. This position had remained vacant since a Pan-Islamic Congress in Mecca in 1926 had failed to agree on a suitable candidate to replace King Hussein of Hejaz. A rival clan of the Husaynis, the Nashashibis, helped to ensure that the mufti was unsuccessful in his bid for the caliphate.

Following the election of Husayni as president of the Congress the agenda was arranged as follows:
 Holy Places and the Buraq wall
 the University of Al Masjid el Aksa
 the Hejaz Railway
 the furtherance of Muslim teaching and culture
 Publications
 Constitution of the Muslim Congress
 Resolutions

The Congress resolved that "Zionism is ipso facto an aggression detrimental to Muslim well-being, and that it is directly or indirectly ousting Moslems from the control of Muslim land and Muslem Holy Places". It was also resolved that the Congress should meet at intervals of two or three years and that resolutions should be enacted by an Executive Committee chaired by Husayni.

See also
 General Islamic Congress

References
'Close Of Moslem Conference, Egyptian Delegate Deported', From Our Correspondent, The Times, Friday, 18 December, 1931; pg. 11; Issue 46009; col B.
Feiler, Gil (1998). From Boycott to Economic Cooperation: The Political Economy of the Arab Boycott of Israel. London: Routledge.  
'Moslem Congress In Jerusalem, Mufti As President', From Our Correspondent, The Times, Wednesday, 9 December, 1931; pg. 11; Issue 46001; col G.
'Moslem Congress Zionist "Peril To Islam"', From Our Correspondent, The Times, Monday, 14 December, 1931; pg. 11; Issue 46005; col C.
Sicker, Martin (2001). The Middle East in the Twentieth Century. Praeger/Greenwood. 
Kramer, Martin (1986). Islam Assembled: The Advent of the Muslim Congresses. Columbia University Press. . A chapter is devoted to the Jerusalem congress.

History of Palestine (region)
1931 conferences
1930s in Islam